Monks Bridge could refer to:

Monks Bridge, River Dove in the English Midlands
Monks' Bridge at Rushen Abbey, Isle of Man
The Monk's Bridge at Calder Abbey, Cumbria
Monk Bridge in York